Lavanya Bhardwaj (born 12 November 1984) is an Indian television actor and model. He is best known for his role as Sahadeva in the mythological TV show Mahabharat.

Personal life 
Bharadwaj met Dede Frescilla, an Indonesian lawyer during the shoot of a show in Indonesia whom he married on 5 February 2016.

Filmography
Television
 Hero – Gayab Mode On (2021) Tarakasur
 kavach 2 (2019) Mowgli Patwardan
Ishq Ka Rang Safed (2016)

Devon Ke Dev...Mahadev as Nahusha
 Mahabharat as Sahadeva
 Hamari Devrani as Dev Kumar Sanghvi 
 Yeh Vaada Raha as Balla bharat chawlla
 Senandung as Evan
 Detective Didi as singhram
 Yudh as Siddharth
 Kahaani Hamaaray Mahaabhaarat Ki as Young Sahadeva

References 

21st-century Indian male actors
Indian male models
Place of birth missing (living people)
Indian male television actors
Living people
1989 births